The following lists events that happened during 1978 in Botswana.

Incumbents
 President: Seretse Khama 
 Vice President: Quett Masire (1966-1980)

Events

Date unknown
 Botswana Football Association is affiliated with FIFA (international governing body of association football).
 Medu Art Ensemble relocates to Gaborone, Botswana.

Births
 August 23 - Ditaola Ditaola, Botswana footballer
 September 19 - Kabelo Kgosiang, Botswana footballer
 November 14 - Odirile Gaolebale, retired Botswanan footballer
 December 29 - Agisanyang Mosimanegape, Botswana former footballer

See also
 History of Botswana
 List of Botswana-related topics
 Outline of Botswana

References

 
Years of the 20th century in Botswana
1970s in Botswana
Botswana
Botswana